Events from the year 1955 in the United States.

Incumbents

Federal Government 
 President: Dwight D. Eisenhower (R-Kansas/New York)
 Vice President: Richard Nixon (R-California)
 Chief Justice: Earl Warren (California)
 Speaker of the House of Representatives: Joseph William Martin Jr. (R-Massachusetts) (until January 3), Sam Rayburn (D-Texas) (starting January 3)
 Senate Majority Leader: William F. Knowland (R-California) (until January 3), Lyndon B. Johnson (D-Texas) (starting January 3)
 Congress: 83rd (until January 3), 84th (starting January 3)

Events

January 
 January 7 – Marian Anderson is the first African-American singer to perform at the Metropolitan Opera in New York City.
 January 22 – The Pentagon announces a plan to develop intercontinental ballistic missiles (ICBMs) armed with nuclear weapons.
 January 28 – The United States Congress authorizes President Dwight D. Eisenhower to use force to protect Formosa from the People's Republic of China.

February 
 February 1 – Major tornadoes in Mississippi.
 February 10 – The Seventh Fleet of the United States Navy helps the Republic of China evacuate Chinese Nationalist army and residents from the Tachen Islands to Taiwan.
 February 12 – President Dwight D. Eisenhower sends the first U.S. advisors to South Vietnam.
 February 14 – WFLA-TV signs on the air in Tampa/St. Petersburg, Florida.
 February 22 – In Chicago's Democratic primary, Mayor Martin H. Kennelly loses to the head of the Cook County Democratic Party, Richard J. Daley, 364,839 to 264,77.

March 
 March 2 – Claudette Colvin, a fifteen-year-old African-American girl, refuses to give up her seat on a bus in Montgomery, Alabama, to a white woman after the driver demands it. She is carried off the bus backwards whilst being kicked and handcuffed and harassed on the way to the police station. She becomes a plaintiff in Browder v. Gayle (1956), which rules bus segregation to be unconstitutional.
 March 5 – WBBJ signs on the air in the Jackson, Tennessee as WDXI, to expanded U.S. commercial television in rural areas.
 March 7 – The 1954 Broadway musical version of Peter Pan, starring Mary Martin, is presented on television for the first time by NBC (also the first time that a stage musical is presented in its entirety on TV exactly as performed on stage). The program gains the largest viewership of a TV special up to this time and becomes one of the first great television classics.
 March 12 – African-American jazz saxophonist Charlie Parker dies in New York City at age 34.
 March 19 – KXTV of Stockton, California signs on the air as the 100th commercial television station in the U.S.
 March 20 – The film adaptation of Evan Hunter's Blackboard Jungle premieres, featuring the famous single "Rock Around the Clock" by Bill Haley & His Comets. Teenagers jump from their seats to dance to the song. On July 9 it becomes the first Rock and roll single to reach Number One on the U.S. charts.
 March 26 – Bill Hayes tops the U.S. charts for five weeks with "The Ballad of Davy Crockett" and starts a (fake) coonskin cap craze.
 March 28 – The important income tax case of Commissioner v. Glenshaw Glass Co. is decided in the Supreme Court.
 March 30 – The 27th Academy Awards ceremony is simultaneously held at RKO Pantages Theatre in Hollywood (hosted by Bob Hope) and at NBC Century Theatre in New York (hosted by Thelma Ritter). Elia Kazan's On the Waterfront wins and receives the most respective awards and nominations with eight and 12, including Best Motion Picture and Kazan's second Best Director win.

April 

 April – Theresa Meikle becomes the presiding judge of San Francisco County Superior Court, the first woman elected to such a position in any major U.S. city.
 April 5 – Richard J. Daley defeats Robert Merrian to become mayor of Chicago by a vote of 708,222 to 581,555.
 April 10 – In the National Basketball Association championship, the Syracuse Nationals defeat the Fort Wayne Pistons 92-91 in Game 7 to win the title.
 April 12 – Jonas Salk's polio vaccine, having passed large-scale trials earlier in the U.S., receives full approval by the Food and Drug Administration.
 April 14 – The Detroit Red Wings win the Stanley Cup in ice hockey for the 7th time in franchise history, but will not win again until 1997.
 April 15 – Ray Kroc opens his first McDonald's in Des Plaines, Illinois.

May 
 May 9 – A young Jim Henson introduces the earliest version of Kermit the Frog (made in March), in the premiere of his puppet show Sam and Friends, on WRC-TV in Washington, D.C.
 May 21 – Chuck Berry records his first single, "Maybellene", for Chess Records in Chicago.

June 
 June 7 – The $64,000 Question premieres on CBS television, with Hal March as the host.
 June 16 – Lady and the Tramp, Walt Disney's 15th animated feature film, premieres in Chicago. It is the first animated film distributed by Disney's own Buena Vista Film Distribution and the first filmed  in CinemaScope widescreen.

July 

 July 17
 The Disneyland theme park opens in Anaheim, California, an event broadcast on the ABC television network.
 The first atomic-generated electrical power is sold commercially, partially powering Arco, Idaho, from the National Reactor Testing Station; on July 18, Schenectady, New York, receives power from a prototype nuclear submarine reactor at Knolls Atomic Power Laboratory.
 July 18 – Illinois Governor William Stratton signs the Loyalty Oath Act, that mandates all public employees take a loyalty oath to the State of Illinois and the U.S. or lose their jobs.
 July 18–23 – Geneva Summit between the U.S., Soviet Union, United Kingdom and France.

August 
 August 1 – The prototype Lockheed U-2 reconnaissance aircraft first flies, in Nevada.
 August 4 – American Airlines Flight 476, a Convair CV-240-0 attempting an emergency landing at Forney Army Airfield, Fort Leonard Wood, Missouri following an engine fire, crashes just short of the runway; all 27 passengers and three crew members are killed.
 August 19 – Hurricane Diane hits the northeast, killing 200 and causing over $1 billion in damage.
 August 22 – Eleven schoolchildren are killed when their school bus is hit by a freight train in Spring City, Tennessee.
 August 28 – Black 14-year-old Emmett Till is lynched and shot in the head for allegedly grabbing and threatening a white woman in Money, Mississippi; his white murderers, Roy Bryant and J. W. Milam, are acquitted by an all-white jury.

September 
 September 3 – African American rock singer Little Richard records "Tutti Frutti" in New Orleans; it is released in October.
 September 10 – Western series Gunsmoke debuts on the CBS television network.
 September 24 – President Dwight D. Eisenhower suffers a coronary thrombosis while on vacation in Denver.
 September 26 – "America's Sweethearts", singers Eddie Fisher and Debbie Reynolds, marry.
 September 30 – Film actor James Dean, aged 24, is killed when his Porsche 550 Spyder collides with another automobile at a highway junction near Cholame, California.

October 
 October – First meeting of the lesbian group that becomes the Daughters of Bilitis.
 October 3 – The Mickey Mouse Club airs on the ABC television network.
 October 4 – The Brooklyn Dodgers win the World Series, defeating the New York Yankees 2–0 in Game 7 of the 1955 Fall Classic.
 October 11 – 70-mm film is introduced with the theatrical release of Rodgers and Hammerstein's masterpiece Oklahoma!.
 October 20 – Disc jockey Bill Randle of WERE (Cleveland) is the key presenter of a concert at Brooklyn High School (Ohio), featuring Pat Boone and Bill Haley & His Comets and opening with Elvis Presley, not only Elvis's first performance north of the Mason–Dixon line, but also his first filmed performance, for a documentary on Randle titled The Pied Piper of Cleveland.
 October 27 – The film Rebel Without a Cause, starring James Dean, is released.

November 
 November 1 – A time bomb explodes in the cargo hold of United Airlines Flight 629, a Douglas DC-6B airliner flying above Longmont, Colorado, killing all 39 passengers and five crew members.
 November 5 – Racial segregation is forbidden on trains and buses in U.S. interstate commerce.
 November 12 – The Bugs Bunny cartoon Roman-Legion Hare debuts.
 November 20 – Bo Diddley makes his television debut on Ed Sullivan's Toast Of The Town show for the CBS network.
 November 27 – Fred Phelps establishes the Westboro Baptist Church in Topeka, Kansas.

December 

 December 1 – Rosa Parks is arrested for refusing to surrender her seat on a bus to a white person in Montgomery, Alabama.
 December 5
The American Federation of Labor and the Congress of Industrial Organizations merge to become the AFL–CIO.
The Montgomery Improvement Association is formed in Montgomery, Alabama by Dr. Martin Luther King Jr. and other Black ministers to coordinate the Montgomery bus boycott by Black people.
 December 14 – Tappan Zee Bridge in New York opens to traffic.
 December 15 – Johnny Cash's "Folsom Prison Blues", recorded on July 30, is released by Sun Records.
 December 22 – Cytogeneticist Joe Hin Tjio discovers the correct number of human chromosomes (46).
 December 31
General Motors becomes the first American corporation to make over US$1 billion in a year.
Michigan J. Frog, a Warner Bros. cartoon character, makes his debut in One Froggy Evening.

Unknown date 
 The Peoria Zoo opens in Illinois.
 Agricultural tractors outnumber horses on U.S. farms for the first time.
 Tappan introduce the first domestic microwave oven.

Ongoing 
 Cold War (1947–1991)
 Second Red Scare (1947–1957)

Births

January–June 
 January 1 – LaMarr Hoyt, baseball player (d. 2021)
 January 2 – Bonnie Arnold, film producer
 January 3
 Hal Rayle, voice actor
 Jon Tiven, composer
 January 4
 Cecilia Conrad, economist and academic
 Brian Ray, session musician
 January 9
 Michiko Kakutani, journalist and critic
 J. K. Simmons, actor
 January 11 – Max Lucado, writer on Christian themes
 January 12 – Rockne S. O'Bannon, writer and producer
 January 13 – Jay McInerney, novelist
 January 18 – Kevin Costner, film actor, producer and director
 January 21 – Jeff Koons, "kitsch" artist
 January 22 – Neil Bush, businessman and investor
 January 23 – Ruth Haring, chess player (d. 2018)
 January 24 – Lynda Weinman, author
 January 26 – Eddie Van Halen, guitarist and innovator (d. 2020)
 January 27 – John Roberts, Chief Justice of the Supreme Court of the U.S. from 2005
 January 28 – Joe Beckwith, baseball player (d. 2021)
 January 29 – Eddie Jordan, basketball player and coach and politician
 January 30
 John Baldacci, politician, 73rd Governor of Maine
 Tom Izzo, basketball player and coach
 Curtis Strange, golfer and sportscaster
 February 5 – Michael Pollan, author and journalist
 February 8 – John Grisham, writer of legal thrillers
 February 10 – Lusia Harris, basketball player (d. 2022)
 February 12 – Bill Laswell, bass player and producer
 February 15
 Janice Dickinson, model, agent, and author 
 Christopher McDonald, actor
 February 18
 Cheetah Chrome, musician
 Tim Hankinson, soccer coach (d. 2022)
 Lisa See, novelist
 February 21 – Kelsey Grammer, TV actor
 February 21 – Kevin Carl Scholz, architect, entrepreneur, professor, artist and business owner
 February 23
 Flip Saunders, basketball coach (d. 2015)
 Jeffrey Sprecher, CEO of Intercontinental Exchange
 February 24 – Steve Jobs, entrepreneur and inventor (d. 2011)
 February 28 – Gilbert Gottfried, actor and stand-up comedian (d. 2022)
 March 2 – Ken Salazar, U.S. Senator from Colorado from 2005 to 2009
 March 5 – Penn Jillette, magician
 March 17 – Gary Sinise, film & TV actor
 March 19 – Bruce Willis, actor
 March 22 – Pete Sessions, politician
 March 30
 Connie Cato, country music singer
 Rhonda Jo Petty, pornographic actress
 Randy VanWarmer, singer-songwriter (d. 2004)
 April 1 –
Terry Nichols, criminal
Martin H. Levenglick, lawyer, New York
 April 6 – Michael Rooker, actor
 April 7
 Grace Hightower, philanthropist, actress and singer
 Gregg Jarrett, lawyer-journalist
 April 8
 Ricky Bell, American football player (died 1984)
 Ron Johnson, U.S. Senator from Wisconsin from 2011
 Barbara Kingsolver, novelist, essayist and poet
 David Wu, Taiwanese-American lawyer and politician
 April 26 – Mike Scott, baseball player
 April 29 – Kate Mulgrew, TV actress
 April 30 – Fred Hiatt, journalist and editor (d. 2021)
 May 2 – Ed Murray, Democratic politician and former mayor of Seattle
 May 6 – Tom Bergeron, TV game-show host
 May 7 – Ben Poquette, basketball player
 May 9 – Kevin Reed, theologian and author
 May 10 – Mark David Chapman, murderer
 May 16 – Debra Winger, film actress
 May 17
 Bill Paxton, film actor (d. 2017)
 Marc Weiner, comedian, puppeteer, and actor
 May 26 – Wesley Walker, American football player and educator
 May 29 – John Hinckley Jr., attempted assassin of Ronald Reagan
 May 31
Bruce Adolphe, pianist, composer, and scholar
Marty Ehrlich, multi-instrumentalist (saxophone, clarinet, and flute)
 June 7 – Joey Scarbury, singer-songwriter
 June 14 – Michael D. Duvall, businessman and politician
 June 16 – Laurie Metcalf, TV actress
 June 25 – Patricia Smith, African-American poet, "spoken-word performer", playwright, author and writing teacher

July–December 
 July 1 – Lisa Scottoline, writer of legal thrillers
 July 9 – Lindsey Graham, U.S. Senator from South Carolina from 2003
 July 18 – Nancy Garrido, kidnapper
 July 21 – Howie Epstein, bass player, songwriter and producer (Tom Petty and the Heartbreakers) (d. 2003)
 July 22 – Willem Dafoe, actor
 August 2
 Caleb Carr, novelist and military historian
 Phase 2 (Lonny Wood), graffiti artist (d. 2019)
 August 4
Alberto Gonzales, 80th United States Attorney General
Billy Bob Thornton, film actor, director, screenwriter, producer and singer-songwriter
 August 13 – Daryl, magician (d. 2017)
 August 24 – Mike Huckabee, Governor of Arkansas
 August 29 – Jack Lew, 76th United States Secretary of the Treasury
 August 30 – Marvin Powell, American football player (d. 2017)
 August 31 – Edwin Moses, track & field athlete
 September 1 – Billy Blanks, martial artist and inventor of Tae Bo exercise program
 September 8 – Terry Tempest Williams, writer, educator and activist
 September 17 – Charles Martinet, actor and voice actor
 September 19 
 Rebecca Blank, economist and academic administrator (d. 2023)
 Rex Smith, actor and singer
 September 29 – Joe Donnelly, U.S. Senator from Indiana from 2013 to 2019
 October 15 – Emily Yoffe, journalist and advice columnist
 October 17 – Tyrone Mitchell, murderer (suicide 1984)
 October 20
 Thomas Newman, film composer
 Sheldon Whitehouse, U.S. Senator from Rhode Island from 2007
 October 21 – Tommy Boggs, baseball player (d. 2022)
 October 26 – Michelle Boisseau, poet (d. 2017)
 October 28
 Ronnie Bass, American football player and sportscaster
 Bill Gates, software designer and entrepreneur
 October 30 – Heidi Heitkamp, U.S. Senator from North Dakota from 2013 to 2019
 November 4 – David Julius, physiologist, recipient of the Nobel Prize in Physiology or Medicine
 November 5 – Kris Jenner, television personality
 November 6 – Paul Romer, economist, recipient of the Nobel Memorial Prize in Economic Sciences
 November 13 – Whoopi Goldberg, African American comic actress
 November 23
 Steven Brust, fantasy author and musician
 Peter Douglas, television and film producer
 Mary Landrieu, U.S. Senator from Louisiana from 1997 to 2015
 November 27 – Bill Nye, science communicator, television presenter and mechanical engineer
 November 29 – Robert Jeffress, pastor
 November 30
 Richard Burr, U.S. Senator from North Carolina from 2005
 Kevin Conroy, stage, screen and voice actor (d. 2022)
 December 11
 Gene Grossman, economist and academic
 Stu Jackson, basketball player, coach and manager
 December 16 – Carol Browner, lawyer, environmentalist and businesswoman
 December 19 – Rob Portman, U.S. Senator from Ohio from 2011
 December 21 – Jane Kaczmarek, television actress
 December 26 – Evan Bayh, U.S. Senator from Indiana from 1999 to 2011

Unknown dates 
 Mark Marderosian, cartoonist

Deaths

January 

 January 1 – Arthur C. Parker, part-Seneca archeologist and ethnographer of Native Americans (b. 1881)
 January 20 – Robert P. Tristram Coffin, poet, essayist and novelist (b. 1892)
 January 21 – Archie Hahn, sprinter (b. 1880)
 January 24 – Ira Hayes, Native American U.S. Marine flag raiser on Iwo Jima (b. 1923)
 January 31 – John Mott, YMCA leader, recipient of the Nobel Peace Prize (b. 1865)

February 
 February 11 – Ona Munson, actress (b. 1903)
 February 12 – Thomas J. Moore, Irish-American film actor (b. 1883)
 February 20 – Oswald Avery, physician and medical researcher (b. 1877)
 February 22 – John T. Walker, Marine Corps lieutenant general (b. 1893)
 February 27 – Trixie Friganza, actress (b. 1870)

March 

 March 3 – Katharine Drexel, Roman Catholic saint (b. 1858)
 March 8 – William C. deMille, screenwriter and director (b. 1878)
 March 9 – Matthew Henson, African-American explorer (b. 1866)
 March 12 – Charlie Parker, African-American jazz saxophonist (b. 1920)

April 

 April 1 – Robert R. McCormick, newspaper publisher (Chicago Tribune) (b. 1880)
 April 7 – Theda Bara, silent film actress (b. 1885)
 April 14 – Cleveland Abbott, African-American football player and coach (b. 1894)
 April 15 – Edgar J. Kaufmann, merchant and patron of Fallingwater (b. 1885)
 April 18 – Albert Einstein, theoretical physicist, developer of theory of relativity (b. 1879 in Germany)

May 
 May 2 – Truman Abbe, surgeon who received awards for his research on radium in medicine (b. 1873)
 May 11
 Francis Pierlot, actor (b. 1875)
 Bradley Walker Tomlin, painter (b. 1899)
 May 14 – Charles Pelot Summerall, general (b. 1867)
 May 16 – James Agee, writer (b. 1909)
 May 18 – Mary McLeod Bethune, educator (b. 1875)
 May 22 – Richard "Skeets" Gallagher, actor (b. 1891)
 May 30 – Bill Vukovich, race-car driver (b. 1918)

June 

 June 5 – Pattillo Higgins, oil pioneer and businessman (b. 1863)
 June 10 – Margaret Abbott, golfer, first American woman to take first place in the Olympics (b. 1876)
 June 11 – Walter Hampden, film actor (b. 1879)
 June 13 – Nora Trueblood Gause, humanitarian (b. 1851)
 June 17 – Carlyle Blackwell, actor (b. 1884)

July 
 July 13 – Stanley Price, film and television actor (b. 1892)
 July 23 – Cordell Hull, United States Secretary of State, recipient of the Nobel Peace Prize (b. 1871)
 July 31 – Robert Francis, actor (b. 1930)

August 

 August 2 – Wallace Stevens, poet (b. 1879)
 August 5 – Carmen Miranda, Portuguese-born Brazilian singer and actress (b. 1909)
 August 8 – Grace Hartman, actress (b. 1907)
 August 11 – Robert W. Wood, optical physicist (b. 1868)
 August 12 – James B. Sumner, chemist, Nobel Prize laureate (b. 1887)
 August 14 – Herbert Putnam, Librarian of Congress (b. 1861)
 August 22 – Olin Downes, music critic (b. 1886)
 August 28 – Emmett Till, murder victim (b. 1941)

September 

 September 1 – Philip Loeb, actor (b. 1891)
 September 2 – Stephen Victor Graham, United States Navy Rear Admiral and 18th Governor of American Samoa (b. 1874)
 September 3 – Georgina Jones, tennis player (b. 1882)
 September 20 – Robert Riskin, screenwriter (b. 1897)
 September 23 – Martha Norelius, Olympic swimmer (b. 1908)
 September 27 – Leslie Garland Bolling, African-American sculptor (b. 1898)
 September 28 – Sarah Blizzard, labor activist (b. 1864)
 September 30
 James Dean, film actor (b. 1931)
 Louis Leon Thurstone, pioneer of psychometrics and psychophysics (b. 1887)

October 
 October 1 – Charles Christie, film studio owner (b. 1880)
 October 8 – Iry LeJeune, Cajun musician (b. 1928)
 October 9 – Alice Joyce, actress (b. 1890)
 October 19 – John Hodiak, film actor (b. 1914)
 October 31 – William Woodward Jr., banker and horse breeder, shot in mariticide (b. 1920)

November 

 November 1 – Dale Carnegie, writer and lecturer (b. 1888)
 November 4 – Cy Young, baseball player (Cleveland Spiders), member of MLB Hall of Fame (b. 1867)
 November 7 – Tom Powers, actor (b. 1890)
 November 11 – Jerry Ross, lyricist and composer (b. 1926)
 November 14 – Robert E. Sherwood, playwright (b. 1896)
 November 15 – Lloyd Bacon, actor and film director (b. 1889)
 November 22 – Shemp Howard, film actor and comedian (The Three Stooges) (b. 1895)
 November 29 – Rene Paul Chambellan, sculptor (b. 1893)

December 

 December 1 – Chief Thundercloud, character actor (b. 1899)
 December 6
 George Platt Lynes, photographer (b. 1907)
 Honus Wagner, baseball player (Pittsburgh Pirates), member of MLB Hall of Fame (b. 1874)
 December 22 – Otto Eppers, cartoonist (b. 1893)
 December 25
 Thomas J. Preston Jr., professor of archeology at Princeton University; second husband of Frances Cleveland (widow of President Grover Cleveland) (b. 1862)
 Elizabeth Harrison Walker, daughter of President Benjamin Harrison and Mary Dimmick Harrison (b. 1897)

See also 
 1955–56 in American soccer
 List of American films of 1955
 Timeline of United States history (1950–1969)

References

External links 
 

 
1950s in the United States
United States
United States
Years of the 20th century in the United States